Charles De Schutter was born in Brussels in December 1975. He is a Belgian musical producer and sound engineer.  In February 2014 he won a "Victoire de la Musique" in France for the best live act with -M-.

Selected discography

Link 

Official website : - http://www.charlesdeschutter.com

References

Living people
Belgian record producers
Year of birth missing (living people)